The 1981 Critérium du Dauphiné Libéré was the 33rd edition of the cycle race and was held from 26 May to 2 June 1981. The race started in Grenoble and finished in Avignon. The race was won by Bernard Hinault of the Renault team.

Teams
Ten teams, containing a total of 99 riders, participated in the race:

Route

General classification

References

Further reading

1981
1981 in French sport
May 1981 sports events in Europe
June 1981 sports events in Europe
1981 Super Prestige Pernod